Himsi ( / ) or Homsi (Levantine Arabic: حُمْصي / Ḥomṣi) is an Arabic locational surname or nisba, which means a person from Homs, Syria. The name may refer to:

Akram al-Homsi, Jordanian politician
Ibn Na'ima al-Himsi (9th century), Syrian translator
Majd Homsi (born 1982), Syrian footballer 
Qustaki al-Himsi (1858–1941), Syrian writer

References

Arabic-language surnames
Syrian families
Homs
Nisbas